Kunwar Danish Ali (born 10 April 1975) is an Indian politician and a Member of Lok Sabha for Amroha since 2019. Ali joined Bahujan Samaj Party in March 2019 after leaving Janata Dal (Secular).

Early life
Ali was born to Kunwar Jafar Ali and Nafees Jafar on 10 April 1975 in Hapur. He graduated from Jamia Millia Islamia University in New Delhi. On 15 January 2005, Ali married Zubia Danish, with whom he has a son and two daughters.

Political career
Ali started his political career with Janata Dal (Secular) and went on to become the general secretary of the party. On 16 March 2019, he joined Bahujan Samaj Party with the consent of Janata Dal (Secular) leader and Karnataka chief minister H.D. Kumaraswamy. Six days later, Bahujan Samaj Party announced that Ali would contest the upcoming 2019 Indian general election from Amroha constituency. On 23 May, he was elected to the Lok Sabha after defeating Kanwar Singh Tanwar of the Bharatiya Janata Party, his nearest rival by a margin of nearly 63,000 votes. Ali was polled 601,082 votes.

He was the leader of Bahujan Samaj party in Lok Sabha from 6 November 2019 - 13 January 2020. He is a member of Consultative Committee for Ministry of Home Affairs since November 2019.

References

|-

|-

External links
Lok Sabha profile
MyNeta profile

1975 births
Living people
Janata Dal (Secular) politicians
Bahujan Samaj Party politicians
India MPs 2019–present
People from Hapur
Jamia Millia Islamia alumni